Jovan Nišić (born 3 March 1998) is a Serbian professional footballer who plays as a midfielder for Pau FC.

Club career
Nišić joined Partizan as a trainee, aged 10. He signed his first professional contract with the club on 13 February 2016, penning a three-year deal. Subsequently, Nišić was assigned to their affiliated side Teleoptik. He helped the team win the Serbian League Belgrade in the 2016–17 season, thus gaining promotion to the Serbian First League. On 19 June 2018, Nišić moved to Voždovac.

At the start of the 2021–2022 campaign, Nišić joigned Pau FC in the French Ligue 2.

International career
Nišić represented Serbia at both under-17 and under-19 level, but failed to qualify for any major youth tournament.

Honours
Teleoptik
 Serbian League Belgrade: 2016–17

Notes

References

External links
 
 Jovan Nišić at Srbijafudbal
 

Association football midfielders
FK Partizan players
FK Teleoptik players
FK Voždovac players
Pau FC players
Serbia youth international footballers
Serbian First League players
Ligue 2 players
Serbian footballers
Footballers from Belgrade
1998 births
Living people
Serbia under-21 international footballers
Serbia international footballers